Muhammed Eren Kıryolcu (born 21 February 2003) is a Turkish professional footballer who plays as a defender  for Denizlispor.

Professional career
Kıryolcu began playing football in his local youth academy Bursa Genç, before stints in the academies of Nilüfer Gençlikspor, Altınordu, Kasımpaşa, Fethiye İY, and finally Denizlispor in 2019. He signed his first professional contract with Denizlispor on 10 September 2020. He made his professional debut with Denizlispor in a 1–0 Süper Lig loss to Hatayspor on 8 May 2020.

References

External links
 
 

2003 births
Living people
People from Yıldırım
Turkish footballers
Denizlispor footballers
Süper Lig players
Association football defenders